Journet is a commune in the Vienne department in the Nouvelle-Aquitaine region in western France.

Geography
The Salleron flows north-northwestward through the eastern part of the commune.

History
After the retreat of the Germans from France in World War II, it was revealed that the French Academy of Sciences had a secret repository of scientific materials, including 100 boxes of records of the French chemist, Lavoisier, and sixty cases of rare mineral specimens. They had been held in the Chateau du Ry at Journet, near Vienne, where the Gestapo and the ERR weren't able to find them.

See also
Communes of the Vienne department

References

Communes of Vienne